This is a list of Professional sports leagues in Asia.

 
Asia
Asia-related lists